Mehdi Harb (born August 23, 1979) is a Tunisian footballer. He currently play .

References 

Tunisian footballers
Tunisian expatriate footballers
1979 births
Living people
Association football forwards
AS Ariana players
Olympique Béja players
Al-Fahaheel FC players
Expatriate footballers in Kuwait
Tunisian expatriate sportspeople in Kuwait
Al-Sahel SC (Kuwait) players
Kuwait Premier League players
Al-Yarmouk SC (Kuwait) players